The sixth season of StarDance (Czech Republic) debuted on Česká televize on November 2, 2013. Eight celebrities were paired with eight professional ballroom dancers. Marek Eben and Tereza Kostková were the hosts for this season.

Couples
The ten professionals and celebrities that competed were:

Scoring Chart

Red numbers indicate the lowest score for each week.
Green numbers indicate the highest score for each week.
 indicates the winning couple.
 indicates the runner-up couple.

Average score chart
This table only counts for dances scored on a 40-point scale.

Highest and lowest scoring performances
The best and worst performances in each dance according to the judges' 40-point scale are as follows:

Couples' highest and lowest scoring dances
Scores are based upon a potential 40-point maximum.

Dance chart
The celebrities and dance partners danced one of these routines for each corresponding week:
 Week 1: Rumba or quickstep
 Week 2: Cha-cha-cha or waltz
 Week 3: Jive or tango
 Week 4: Paso Doble or Slowfox
 Week 5: Samba and salsa
 Week 6: One unlearned dance
 Week 7: One unlearned dance
 Week 8: Couples' choice and freestyle

 Highest scoring dance
 Lowest scoring dance

External links
 Official website

6
2013 Czech television seasons